The 2022 Grand Canyon Antelopes men's volleyball team represented Grand Canyon University in the 2022 NCAA Division I & II men's volleyball season. The 'Lopes, led by seventh year head coach Matt Werle, played their home games at GCU Arena. The 'Lopes were members of the MPSF and were picked to finish fourth in the MPSF preseason poll. The Lopes finished fourth in the MPSF but fell in the 1st Round of the MPSF Tournament to Stanford.

Season highlights
Will be filled in as the season progresses.

Roster

Schedule
TV/Internet Streaming information:
All home games will be streamed on ESPN+. Most road games will also be streamed by the schools streaming service. The conference tournament will be streamed by FloVolleyball. 

 *-Indicates conference match. (#)-Indicates tournament seeding.
 Times listed are Time in Arizona.

Announcers for televised games

McKendree: Diana Johnson & Houston Boe
McKendree: Diana Johnson & Houston Boe
Penn State: Connor Griffin & Alex Rocco
Penn State: Zech Lambert & Alex Rocco
UC San Diego: Bryan Fenley & Ricci Luyties
Benedictine: Diana Johnson & Houston Boe
Master's: Diana Johnson & Braden Dohrmann
Loyola Chicago: Ray Gooden & Kris Berzins
Lewis: Cody Lindeman, Bella Ray, & Andrea Zeiser
UC Santa Barbara: Houston Boe & Diana Johnson
UC Santa Barbara: Diana Johnson & Amanda Roach
Pepperdine: Diana Johnson & Houston Boe
Pepperdine: Diana Johnson & Amanda Roach
BYU: Jarom Jordan, Steve Vail & Kiki Solano
BYU: Jarom Jordan, Steve Vail, & Kiki Solano
UCLA: Denny Cline
UCLA: Denny Cline
Harvard: Diana Johnson & Amanda Roach
Harvard: Diana Johnson & Houston Boe
Tusculum: Diana Johnson & Houston Boe
Tusculum: Diana Johnson & Amanda Roach
Concordia Irvine: Ben Rose & Ron J. Ruhman
Concordia Irvine: Patience O'Neal
Stanford: Diana Johnson & Houston Boe
Stanford: Diana Johnson & Houston Boe
USC: Diana Johnson & Amanda Roach
USC: Diana Johnson & Houston Boe
MPSF Tournament Quarterfinal- Stanford: Nick Koop

Rankings 

^The Media did not release a Pre-season poll.

References

2022 in sports in Arizona
2022 NCAA Division I & II men's volleyball season
Grand Canyon